Karl Konan (born 3 June 1995) is a French handball player for Montpellier Handball and the French national team. He was born in the Ivory Coast.

References

1995 births
Living people
French male handball players
Montpellier Handball players